Lapland New Forest was a Christmas-themed park near Ringwood, Hampshire, UK. The park had been advertised as being a "winter wonderland" with a variety of exciting family events such as a Christmas market and a "magical tunnel of light", but the majority of the promised attractions either malfunctioned or were of a very low quality. The park closed after a week following complaints from customers and poor press attention, and the organisers were charged with misleading advertising, and sentenced to 13 months in prison.

Venue

Upon opening on 28 November 2008, the park received a great deal of infamy in the United Kingdom due to the extremely poor quality of its attractions; the nativity scene was a crudely painted billboard that could be seen across a muddy field, the 'magical tunnel of light' was a line of trees with fairy lights dangling from them, the ice rink had melted due to a faulty generator, the 'log cabins' were empty garden sheds, the Christmas market consisted of only four stalls and required an extra fee to enter, husky dogs and reindeer were mistreated and tethered in muddy conditions, and Santa's grotto was a very badly decorated cabin.

Children who had looked forward to the event were reduced to tears, especially when Santa was caught smoking. Violence began flaring up between visitors and workers, including an elf who was slapped and yelled at by a mother who complained about the event, two fathers brawling in the Gingerbread house, Santa being punched in the face by a father who became furious after being told his children were not allowed to sit on Santa's lap despite waiting in a four hour-long line, and a worker dressed up as a snowman received so much verbal abuse that he eventually walked off in full costume.

50,000 tickets were sold in advance with ticket prices beginning at £25. Over £1.2 million had been made in total. After being open for less than one week the park closed and its website was removed. In February 2011, Victor and Henry Mears, the brothers who ran the park, were found guilty of misleading advertising, and were jailed for 13 months each in March 2011.

In October 2011 the pair had their convictions overturned by the Court of Appeal following revelations that one of the jurors had been texting her fiance during the trial. The fiance had been present in court and the text messages (one of which simply read "guilty") had been seen by other jurors. The Court of Appeal's view was that this made the convictions unsafe. Dorset County Council, which had brought the original prosecution, subsequently indicated that it would not be seeking a retrial as the brothers had already served prison sentences.

References

2008 establishments in England
2008 disestablishments in England
Amusement parks opened in 2008
Amusement parks closed in 2008
Defunct amusement parks in the United Kingdom
Defunct amusement parks in England